The  is a botanical garden in the southeast corner of Nagai Park, Higashisumiyoshi-ku, Osaka, Japan. An admission fee is charged.

The garden contains the Osaka Museum of Natural History as well as a 1,000 species collection of flowers and trees around a central pond.

See also 

 List of botanical gardens in Japan

References 
 Nagai Botanical Garden 

Botanical gardens in Japan
Gardens in Osaka Prefecture
Higashisumiyoshi-ku, Osaka